The San Francisco Writers Workshop is one of the oldest continuously running writing critique groups in the United States, meeting every Tuesday night, except for major holidays, since 1946. Successful published authors who first workshopped their books in the group include Khaled Hosseini, David Henry Sterry, Aaron Hamburger, Joe Quirk, Michelle Gagnon, Kemble Scott, Tamim Ansary, Erika Mailman, Zack Lynch, Zarina Zabrisky, and Ransom Stephens.

Tamim Ansary moderated the workshop for twenty-two years until his retirement in 2015. Currently, the workshop is moderated by Kurt Wallace Martin, Judy Viertel, James Warner, Monya Baker, and Olga Zilberbourg. The workshop is free and open to all interested writers and genres, providing a forum to share work-in-progress and receive constructive critiques from other writers. The group meets at Noisebridge, in  San Francisco's Mission district.

Sessions are uniquely structured so participants share, aloud, up to six double-spaced pages of their work at a time. Writers are not allowed to speak or respond while the group critiques their work.

San Francisco Writers Workshop Alumni
Some of the published authors who have emerged from the workshop:

Note: Partial List - Updates Requested

Tamim Ansary, author of West of Kabul, East of New York, The Other Side of the Sky: A Memoir, Destiny Disrupted: A History of the World Through Islamic Eyes, The Widow's Husband
George Benet, author of A Short Dance in the Sun, A Place in Colusa
Robin Bullard, author of I Came by Cab. Robin moderated the workshop from 2015 to 2016
Melodie Bowsher, author of My Lost and Found Life
Michael Chorost, author of  Rebuilt: How Becoming Part Computer Made Me More Human, World Wide Mind: The Coming Integration of Humanity, Machines, and the Internet
Christine Comaford, author of Rules for Renegades
Elaine Elison, coauthor with Stan Yogi of Wherever There's a Fight: How Runaway Slaves, Suffragists, Immigrants, Strikers, and Poets Shaped Civil Liberties in California
Tim Floreen, author of Willful Machines
Michelle Gagnon, author of The Tunnels, Boneyard, The Gatekeeper, Kidnap & Ransom
Stan Golberg, author of Lessons for the Living
Yanina Gotsulsky, author of Speed of Life
Aaron Hamburger, author of The View from Stalin's Head, Faith for Beginners
Leonard Irving, author of Farewell Dundrennan, The Bird Poems, Beyond Hadrian's Wall
Khaled Hosseini, author of The Kite Runner, A Thousand Splendid Suns
Irete Lazo, author of The Accidental Santera
Gary Johnston, author of Kazoo Bop
Marlene Lee, author of The Absent Woman, Rebecca's Road, Scoville, Limestone Wall, No Certain Home
Ella Leffland, author of Rumors of Peace, The Knight, Death and the Devil, Love Out of Season, Breath and Shadows, Mrs. Munck, 
Dean Lipton, author of Malpractice: Autobiography of a Victim, Faces of Crime and Genius: the Historical Impact of the Genius-Criminal 
Erika Mailman, author of Woman of Ill Fame, The Witch's Trinity
Elise Frances Miller, author of The Berkeley Girl, In Paris, 1968 (originally published as A Time to Cast Away Stones), The Berkeley Girl: Rendezvous in LondonPeg Alford Pursell, author of Show Her a Flower a Bird a ShadowJoe Quirk, author of The Ultimate Rush, It's Not You, It's Biology, Exult, Seasteading, Call to the RescueKemble Scott, (novelist pen name of Scott James, columnist for The New York Times) author of SoMa, The SowerMichael Sheahan, author of The Sean
Holly Shumas, author of Five Things I Can't Live Without, Love and Other Natural DisastersRansom Stephens, author of The God PatentIlse Sternberger, author of Princes Without a Home: Modern Zionism and the Strange Fate of Theodor Herzl's ChildrenDavid Henry Sterry, author of Chicken: Self Portrait of a Young Man for Rent, Master of Ceremonies: A Story Story of Sex, Drugs, Roller skates, and Murder, editor of Ho's Hookers, Callgirls, and RentboysBryna Stevens, author of Frank Thompson: Her Civil War Story, Handl and the Famous Sword Swallower of Halle, Deborah Sampson Goes to War, Ben Franklin's Glass ArmonicaMary Tall Mountain, author of A Quick Brush of Wings, Listen to the Night, Light on the Tent WallIan Tuttle, author of StretchyHeadJames Warner, author of All Her Father's GunsZarina Zabrisky, author of Iron and We, Monsters
Amy Zemser, author of Beyond the Mango Tree''

External links
San Francisco Writers Workshop Web Page

References

Writing circles
Organizations based in San Francisco
Culture of San Francisco
San Francisco Bay Area literature